Battlestar Galactica is a space battleship in the original and re-imagined science fiction television series Battlestar Galactica. In the series, the Twelve Colonies built approximately 120 Battlestars during their thousand-year war with the Cylons, whose own battleships are known as Basestars.

Battlestar Galactica (1978, 1980)

Introduction 

One of several Battlestars constructed by the Twelve Colonies of Man, Galactica represents the colonial planet Caprica, and is crewed mostly by Capricans. Galactica was launched more than 500 yahren before the close of the Thousand Yahren War (and the start of the pilot film). It is believed to be the only Battlestar to survive the destruction of the Twelve Colonies, until Battlestar Pegasus is found. Galactica is commanded by Commander Adama.

In the pre-Holocaust Colonial Service, Battlestars like Galactica operated as part of numbered naval fleets (e.g., the Fourth Fleet). A typical fleet comprised 600 fighting ships and operated independently from other fleets. Since the Holocaust, Galactica is the military's sole capital ship of any kind, except briefly for the Pegasus.

Speed and armament 
Galactica is capable of lightspeed travel, although while escorting the refugee fleet she must limit her speed to that of the slowest ship. Galactica also has a complement of shuttles. Unlike similar civilian models, these transport craft include military gear for detecting electronic emissions from other spacecraft and drop chutes for paratroop assaults. In addition, Galactica has armored, tracked ground vehicles known as "landrams" and "snowrams." These are armed with an open turret on the roof and are landed by shuttles. Galactica carries a large number of manually aimed laser batteries, both for anti-aircraft defense against fighters and for engaging other capital ships. As to purely defensive measures, Galactica is protected by both "electronic shields" and a heavy metal double-pocket hatch shield that covers its panoramic bridge viewport; the latter is closed in "positive shield" state and open in "negative shield" state. However, while these might provide limited protection, they are insufficient to guard against suicide ramming runs by Cylon raiders or pulsar-cannon fire from Cylon base ships. Galactica also has the ability to project a broad cone of energy, wide enough to cover much of one hemisphere of an Earth-sized planet, that is powerful enough to destroy ballistic missiles and their nuclear warheads.

Energy 

A Battlestar such as Galactica has two sources of energy. The engines are powered by Tylium, a highly volatile liquid fuel derived from minerals mined on a limited number of planets. The Tylium is stored in two tanks located as far inboard as possible, since the detonation of either tank is sufficient to destroy the Battlestar. Other energy needs are met by energizers, which are self-contained generators roughly the size of a human adult. These are located all across Galactica. Networked to each other, they are able to supply sufficient power to meet Galactica's needs even if some of them should fail.

Other Battlestars 

Seven other Battlestars are specifically named in the series. They are Acropolis, Atlantia, Columbia, Pacifica, Pegasus, Rycon, and Triton. Of the other ships it is known that Atlantia, Acropolis, Pacifica, and Triton were destroyed at the Battle of Cimtar in "Saga of a Star World." (Atlantia, the colonial president's Battlestar, is actually seen exploding before Galactica leaves the fleet to speed to the Colonies' defense, only to arrive too late.) The Columbia is mentioned in the episode "Gun on Ice Planet Zero" when a captured colonial pilot being interrogated says that he is from the Columbia, but a Cylon Centurion refutes him saying it was also destroyed at Cimtar. Rycon is mentioned in passing in the episode "Take The 'Celestra' " as the ship of Commander Kronus. Pegasus is encountered in "The Living Legend." Novelizations based on the original series, various comic books, and other sources (original artwork for costume designs with ships' names and logos) have named several other Battlestars, including Bellerophon, Solaria, Cerberus, Olympia, and Prometheus.

Battlestar Galactica (2003) 

In the re-imagined series, there were about 120 Battlestars in service prior to the second Cylon attack.

Galactica (BS-75) entered service in the early years of the first Cylon War, under the command of Commander Silas Nash. During her service, Galactica formed a part of Battlestar Group 75 (BSG 75), a colonial force described by series creator Ronald D. Moore as a mixed force of vessels somewhat similar to a US Navy carrier strike group. After graduating from the Colonial Military Academy, William Adama's first posting was to Galactica as a Raptor pilot.

Like many of her sister ships that survived the first Cylon War, Galactica underwent refits and upgrades (for example, at the end of her career, she was equipped with the latest Mark VII Viper space superiority fighter). However, the computer systems were never networked nor integrated during these refits.

Due to this lack of network integration at the time of the Cylon attack, Galactica was unaffected by the infiltration program used by the Cylons to disable colonial vessels and defense systems, using the Command Navigation Program (CNP), developed by Dr. Gaius Baltar and subverted by Cylon operative Number Six as a back door into such systems.

At the time of the Cylon Attack, Galactica was fifty years old and was undergoing formal decommissioning from the Colonial Fleet following her retirement as an operational vessel. The ship had been due to become a museum commemorating the first Cylon War and an educational center, with much of its outer armor and a number of weapons having been stripped. Due to its age and operating conditions, the ship is unofficially known as "The Bucket" by the crews of both Pegasus and Galactica. Galactica's starboard launch pod was outfitted as a Cylon war museum; this exhibit remained intact until the final mission against the Cylon colony.

Since the Cylon attack, in keeping with the concept of the original 1978 series, Galactica became both protector and provider to a small fleet of civilian vessels searching for the legendary planet Earth.

Galactica took heavy damage during its raid against the Cylons on planet New Caprica, and her hull was now clearly darker with burn marks and missile hits, most notably the three large holes on her back where the armor was weakest.

The starboard hangar pod had been converted into a museum prior to Galacticas intended decommissioning. The starboard hangar deck was used to house civilian refugees from New Caprica after the evacuation, and earned the nickname "Camp Oilslick". In "A Measure of Salvation", which followed "Torn", Major Lee Adama informs Galactica that their Raptor was on approach to the starboard landing deck, which indicated that the starboard flight pod had started flight operations again. However, this is likely a dialogue error because in the finale it was still shown to be a museum and Oilslick was never moved.

In the episode "The Woman King", 300 additional passengers were shown being moved to the starboard hangar deck, and the area was given the name "Dogsville" by the Galactica crew. Upon arriving, each passenger was checked for medical issues by civilian doctors and medical staff. Also now housed in the starboard hangar deck was a makeshift bar called "Joe's", located behind a storage area. Joe's was equipped with a bumper pool table, Pyramid arcade area, and a heavily damaged Mark II Viper hanging over the bar. The bar was first seen in the episode "Taking a Break from All Your Worries". The bar appeared to have an alcohol still, similar to the one Chief Tyrol built in the port hangar deck, in the center of it. The piano that Kara Thrace plays in the episode "Someone to Watch Over Me" is located in Joe's Bar.

In the episode "The Passage" Galactica was used to house fleet passengers during the trip through a star cluster, leaving the fleet vessels to be flown by skeleton crews with radiation medication.

Galactica was seen taking multiple hits from Cylon nuclear weapons and though the ship suffered damage, she was still operational. It is unclear exactly how well rated the Cylon nuclear weapons were versus Galacticas armor. Also, as the nukes detonated outside of the vessel, most of the energy would have been directed and attenuated out into the area of least resistance: space. However, the punishment has apparently begun to accumulate. In "Blood on the Scales", after disabling the FTL drive, Chief Tyrol noticed a large crack in an interior wall; in the subsequent episode, "No Exit", a more detailed inspection reveals hairline fractures and more obvious structural damage throughout the ship. The damage is aggravated by the fact that the original builders of the ship 'cut corners' during her construction. Tyrol suggests applying a Cylon organic resin that will bond itself into the hull, both repairing and strengthening the metal as it matures. Admiral Adama initially refuses the idea, but after finding cracks in the bulkheads of his quarters, he gives Tyrol permission to do whatever it takes to repair Galactica. The repairs were not proceeding well, with numerous electrical faults occurring throughout the ship. When Boomer made her escape, she jumped her Raptor close to the port forward section of the bow, causing a spatial distortion which caused massive damage both externally and internally, exacerbating the already heavy structural damage.

At the onset of the series, Galacticas last operational squadron of Mark VII Vipers participated in the decommissioning ceremony before departing the ship for reassignment. The squadron was redirected to intercept a group of Cylon fighters and was subsequently disabled by the Cylon computer virus and destroyed. The Mark II Vipers meant for Galacticas museum display were pressed into service to defend the ship; these and a small number of Mark VIIs comprised the ship's fighter complement until the arrival of the Battlestar Pegasus midway through the second season. Pegasus possessed construction facilities and flight simulators that allowed it to build and train new Mark VII Vipers and pilots to strengthen the squadrons of both ships. When Pegasus was destroyed during the liberation of New Caprica, her nearly intact squadrons were transferred to Galactica, giving the latter a full complement of Vipers. By the time of the episode He That Believeth in Me, there were more Vipers available than qualified pilots, and trainees were pressed into service to defend the fleet. A significant number of pilots participated in the mutiny led by Tom Zarek and Felix Gaeta. The pilots who refused to assist William Adama in retaking the ship were court-martialed and incarcerated aboard the fleet prison vessel. The further reduction in manpower forces Adama to allow Cylon heavy raiders from the renegade basestar to assist in CAP duties alongside Galacticas regular pilots.

Due to the ship's age, battle damage, and subpar materials used in her construction, Galactica eventually begins to show signs of severe metal fatigue. Attempts to seal the ship's multiple stress fractures with the Cylon resin fail, and Adama orders the ship to be abandoned and stripped of weapons, parts and supplies. The discovery of the Cylon colony gives Galactica a brief reprieve, and a skeleton crew embarks on a mission to rescue the Cylon/human child Hera.

The crew of volunteers is supplemented by Cylon centurions from the rebel base ship as well as a small number of civilians including Laura Roslin, Gaius Baltar, and Tory Foster. Samuel Anders, a Cylon left in a vegetative state due to brain damage, is connected to the ship's systems, effectively becoming the Battlestar's version of a Cylon hybrid.

Galactica jumps to within point blank firing range of the colony, making it impossible for missiles to be utilized, and sustains more damage in the exchange of gunfire. Anders successfully disrupts the colony's systems and shuts down their weapons. A squadron of Raptors jumps from Galactica'''s starboard landing bay, destroying it in the process, and the Battlestar is rammed into the colony. Marine and centurion assault teams from the Raptors and from Galactica are successful in rescuing Hera, but a counterassault by the remaining Cylon forces in the colony results in a standoff. A truce is negotiated, but hostilities resume when the Final Five fail to transmit the plans for Cylon resurrection to the colony. The colony is hit by several nukes accidentally fired from a disabled Raptor and begins being pulled into a nearby black hole. Kara Thrace jumps Galactica without retracting the landing pods, resulting in severe structural fractures along its length, effectively breaking the ship's back and rendering Galactica incapable of jumping again.

Thrace uses co-ordinates derived from the musical notes of a song that has haunted both her and the Final Five Cylons, resulting in the ship arriving at the planet that will eventually become modern-day Earth. A Raptor is sent to rendezvous with the fleet, and the survivors of the Twelve Colonies settle on the planet along with the remaining Cylon rebels. Galactica'' and the other ships in the fleet are abandoned. Admiral Adama flies the last Viper off the ship, and the Battlestar and its fleet are scuttled by Samuel Anders, who pilots them on their last flight directly into the Sun.

References

Battlestar Galactica
Fictional spacecraft